Domínguez is a surname of Spanish origin. Domínguez may also refer to:

Places
Comitán de Domínguez, formal name of the city of Comitán, Chiapas State, Mexico
California State University, Dominguez Hills, Carson, California, USA
Dominguez High School, Compton, California, USA
Dominguez Channel, a 15.7-mile-long (25.3 km) stream in southern Los Angeles County, California.
Rancho Dominguez, California, a small part of the Spanish land grant Rancho San Pedro from the King of Spain in 1784.

Other
Battle of Dominguez Rancho, 1847 military battle of the Mexican-American War
Belisario Domínguez Medal of Honor, the highest award bestowed by the Mexican government
United States v. Dominguez Benitez, 2004 decision of the US Supreme Court regarding plea bargains